Plynnon is a genus of Southeast Asian araneomorph spiders in the family Phrurolithidae, first described by Christa L. Deeleman-Reinhold in 2001.  it contains only three species, all from Indonesia and Borneo.

References

Araneomorphae genera
Phrurolithidae